Pseudocentema is a genus of phasmids belonging to the tribe Necrosciini fromChina.

Species:

Pseudocentema bispinatum 
Pseudocentema liui

References

Lonchodidae